Amir Yacoby is a condensed matter physicist and professor at Harvard University. In 1994 he obtained his PhD at Weizmann Institute of Science under the supervision of professor Moty Heiblum and was appointed as the Lazaridis Chair in Physics of Institute for Quantum Computing in 2013. In March 2014, his group developed a magnetic resonance imaging technology by which nanoscale images can be provided, that could enable researchers to peer into atomic structure of individual molecules. In 2014, Yacoby was named a Fellow of the American Association for the Advancement of Science.

References

External links

20th-century births
Living people
American physicists
Weizmann Institute of Science alumni
Harvard University faculty
Fellows of the American Association for the Advancement of Science
Year of birth missing (living people)
Place of birth missing (living people)
Fellows of the American Physical Society